Reading railway station is a major transport hub in Reading, Berkshire, England.

Reading is the ninth-busiest station in the UK outside London, and the second busiest interchange station outside London, with over 3.8 million passengers changing trains at the station annually.

The station is managed by Network Rail and is served by four train operating companies: Great Western Railway, CrossCountry, South Western Railway and the Elizabeth line.

History

Original station

The first Reading station was opened on 30 March 1840 as the temporary western terminus of the original line of the Great Western Railway (GWR). The time taken to travel from London to Reading was reduced to one hour and five minutes, less than a quarter of the time taken by the fastest stagecoach. The line was extended to its intended terminus at Bristol in 1841. As built, Reading station was a typical Brunel-designed single-sided intermediate station, with separate up and down platforms situated to the south of the through tracks and arranged so that all up trains calling at Reading had to cross the route of all down through trains.

In 1844, the Great Western Hotel was opened across the Forbury Road for people visiting the town. It is thought to be the oldest surviving railway hotel in the world. New routes soon joined the London to Bristol line, with the line from Reading to Newbury and Hungerford opening in 1847, and the line to Basingstoke in 1848.

Between 1865 and 1867, a station building, built of buff bricks from Coalbrookdale with Bath Stone dressings, and incorporating a tower and clock, was constructed for the Great Western Railway. Sources differ as to whether this was a new building, or remodelling of an earlier Brunel building. In 1898 the single sided station layout was replaced by a conventional design with 'up', 'down' and 'relief' platforms linked by a pedestrian subway.

Access to the station from Broad Street was not direct, until Queen Victoria Street was built in 1903. This provided a route through to Friar Street and Station Road.

The station was originally named Reading and became Reading General on 26 September 1949 to distinguish it from the neighbouring ex-South Eastern Railway station. The "General" suffix was dropped from British Rail timetables in 1973, but some of the station nameboards still stated "Reading General" in 1974. The juxtaposition of the two stations meant that the town's buses showed the destination 'Stations'.

1965 combined station

From 6 September 1965, services from the former  station were diverted into a newly constructed terminal platform (4A) in the General station. This was long enough for a single eight coach train, which was later found to be inadequate, and so a second terminal platform (4B) serving the same line was opened in 1975 for the commencement of the service from Reading to Gatwick Airport.

1989 redevelopment
In 1989 a brand new station concourse was opened by InterCity, including a shopping arcade named after Brunel, opened on the western end of the old  station site, linked to the platforms of the main station by a new footbridge. At the same time a new multi-level station car park was built on the site of the former goods yard and signal works to the north of the station, and linked to the same footbridge. The station facilities in the 1860s station building were converted into The Three Guineas public house. Elizabeth II reopened the station on 4 April 1989.

2009–2015 redevelopment

By 2007, the station had become an acknowledged bottleneck on the railway network, with passenger trains often needing to wait outside the station for a platform to become available. This was caused by limited number of through-platforms, the flat junctions immediately east and west of the station and the need for north–south trains to reverse direction in the station. The Great Western Main Line at Reading has two pairs of tracks – the Main ('fast') lines on the southern side and the Relief ('slow') lines on the northern side. Trains transferring between the Relief lines and the lines that run through Reading West (to Taunton and to Basingstoke) had to cross the Main lines. Those trains, especially slow-moving freight trains, blocked the paths of express trains.

In July 2007, in its white paper Delivering a Sustainable Railway, the government announced plans to improve traffic flow at Reading, specifically mentioned along with Birmingham New Street station as "key congestion pinch-points" which would share investment worth £600 million. On 10 September 2008 Network Rail unveiled a £400 million regeneration and reconfiguration of the station and surrounding track to reduce delays. The following changes were made:
Five new platforms: Four new through platforms on the northern side and an extra bay platform for the Wokingham lines.
A new footbridge on the western side of the station, replacing the 1989 footbridge. This also included a new entrance on the southern side, for ticket holders only.
A new street-level entrance and ticket office on the northern side of the station.
The original subway was converted into a pedestrian underpass between the two sides of the station, with no access to the platforms.
Making the Cow Lane bridge under the tracks two-way with a cycle path.
A flyover to the west of the station for trains to allow fast trains to cross over the lines to Reading West, replacing the flat junction.
A section of track beneath the flyover to provide a connection between Reading West and the relief lines.
The redevelopment was designed to provide provision for future Crossrail and Heathrow Airtrack services at Reading station.

The improvements have allowed capacity for at least 4 extra trains in each direction every hour and 6 extra freight trains a day (equivalent to 200 lorries). The local council has also planned developments of the surrounding area in association with the developments at the station.

The cost of the project rose to £897m, but it was completed a year earlier than expected. The rebuilt station was reopened by Queen Elizabeth II on 17 July 2014.

Network Rail took over management of the station from First Great Western in April 2014.

Electrification of the Great Western main line through Reading station was completed in time for electric trains to commence service between Paddington and Didcot Parkway on 2 January 2018.

Motive power depot
The GWR built a small engine shed in the junction of the lines to Didcot and those to Basingstoke in 1841. This was enlarged and rebuilt in 1876 and again in 1930. It was closed by British Railways in 1965 and replaced by a purpose-built Traction Maintenance Depot. This was subsequently relocated by Network Rail, during the redevelopment works in the early 2010s, to the northern side of the tracks to the west of the station.

Accidents and incidents
Extreme weather was the cause of an early casualty in the station's history. On the wall of the main station building there is a brass plaque, commemorating the event.

On 12 September 1855, a light engine was dispatched on the wrong line. It was in a head-in collision with a passenger train. Four people were killed and many were injured.

An accident occurred at Reading on 17 June 1914, and was witnessed by the railway historian O. S. Nock, then a schoolboy.

T. E. Lawrence (Lawrence of Arabia) lost the 250,000-word first draft of his Seven Pillars of Wisdom at the station when he left his briefcase while changing trains in 1919. Working from memory, as he had destroyed his notes after completion of the first draft, he then completed a 400,000-word second draft in three months.

German aircraft tried to bomb the lines into the station during the beginning of World War II.

On 1 August 1990, Class 119 diesel multiple unit L576 collided with a passenger train comprising 4VEP electric multiple units 3508 & 3504, and 4CIG unit 1304 due to overrunning signals. Forty people were injured.

On 23 October 1993, an IRA bomb exploded at a signal post near the station, some hours after 5 lb (2 kg) of Semtex was found in the toilets of the station. The resulting closure of the railway line and evacuation of the station caused travel chaos for several hours, but no-one was injured.

Location
The station is on the northern side of central Reading, off the Inner Distribution Road. Its postcode is RG1 1LZ.

Station layout

From 2013 

The station has fifteen platforms. The nine through-platforms are numbered 7–15, each split into "a" (eastern end) and "b" (western end) sections. Platforms 7–11 are on the main (fast) lines, whereas 12–15 are on the relief (slow) lines. Relief line platforms 13–15 have access to the underpass for services to London Waterloo and Gatwick Airport.

In 2011 

Until 2013, Reading station had four through-platforms and eight terminal platforms.

On 27 December 2011, the new platform 4 was opened, with all higher numbered platforms re-numbered:

 main line platforms 4 and 5 became 7 and 8
 relief line platforms 8 and 9 became 9 and 10
 the north bay become platform 11
 bay platform 6, which would be removed later in the redevelopment, was renumbered 16

Platform 5 (old 4b) opened on 23 April 2012, with platform 6 (old 4a) following on 12 July. The Easter 2013 blockade resulted in the opening of new platforms 12 to 15 and the closure of the old east bay platform 16.  Work then commenced to rebuild platform 11 into a through platform, following which the adjacent platform 10 was rebuilt to match.

In March 2013 the subway reopened as a public right of way from the north to the south of the station, with no platform access. This enabled removal of the old footbridge to commence, starting with the two sections nearest the car park which were lifted out in the first two weeks of that month. On 29 March 2013 the new transfer deck was opened, ready for the opening of the new platforms on 2 April. By 7 April 2013 the old footbridge had been completely removed.

Recycling of infrastructure
During the station's major reconstruction, and the associated moving of locomotive stabling and the servicing depot from south of the Great Western Main Line to its north, a number of major components either became redundant or were no longer needed. Network Rail offered these to museums and the railway preservation movement, for a zero price, but subject to the cost of delivery being recompensed.

Services

The station plays a key role in serving the Great Western Main Line, the line which runs west from London Paddington station to Reading. To the west of Reading station, the line splits into two branches, allowing it to serve a variety of communities in the West and South West of England and onward into South Wales. Some services on the Great Western Main Line terminate at Bristol, while others continue on the Bristol to Exeter line towards the West Country. The other branch to the west of Reading station is the Reading to Taunton line (the "Berks and Hants" line), which serves communities in Berkshire and Wiltshire. The Reading to Taunton branch joins services travelling south from Bristol on the Bristol to Exeter line at Cogload Junction, to the north of Taunton. The line proceeds to serve the stations of Taunton,  and onward to stations in Cornwall such as  where the branch to  diverges where some trains terminate whilst most terminate at the terminus of Penzance. Both high-speed intercity services and local services are operated by Great Western Railway. Nearly all services are timetabled to stop at Reading.

Through services from north to south on these lines are operated by CrossCountry, and all services stop at Reading, which requires the trains to reverse in the station.

The Elizabeth line operates a service to Abbey Wood, stopping at most stations to Ealing Broadway. On Sunday mornings and Sunday nights, trains terminate at London Paddington instead.

Pending the construction of the direct rail route to Heathrow Airport, an express bus service, RailAir, links Reading to London Heathrow Airport, as do suburban services via Hayes & Harlington.

Proposed Heathrow Airport links
Reading station was intended to be the western terminus for the proposed Heathrow Airtrack rail service. This project, promoted by BAA, envisaged the construction of a spur from the Waterloo to Reading Line to Heathrow Airport, creating direct rail links from the airport to Reading, London Waterloo,  and Guildford. Airtrack was cancelled by BAA in April 2011 but, in October 2011, Wandsworth Council announced a revised plan called Airtrack-Lite.

More recently, the Government has committed to the construction of a rail route from Heathrow Terminal 5 to the GWR main line between Iver and Langley, with a west-facing junction there, thus providing for a direct route from Heathrow to the West. Great Western Railway will run this route when completed in 2027, connecting up with the Elizabeth Line branch and replacing the Heathrow Express. See Western Rail Link to Heathrow.

References

Notes

Bibliography

External links

Reading station area redevelopment

Railway stations in Berkshire
Transport in Reading, Berkshire
Grade II listed buildings in Reading
Grade II listed railway stations
Great Western Main Line
Isambard Kingdom Brunel railway stations
Network Rail managed stations
Railway stations in Great Britain opened in 1840
Former Great Western Railway stations
Railway stations served by CrossCountry
Railway stations served by Great Western Railway
Railway stations served by South Western Railway
Railway stations served by the Elizabeth line